Kim Hyun-sung (born March 28, 1993) is a South Korean football player. He plays for J3 League club SC Sagamihara.

References

External links
 
 

1993 births
Living people
South Korean footballers
J3 League players
SC Sagamihara players
Association football goalkeepers